Pandanus decumbens is a species of plant in the family Pandanaceae. It is endemic to New Caledonia.

References

Endemic flora of New Caledonia
decumbens
Vulnerable plants
Taxonomy articles created by Polbot
Taxa named by Adolphe-Théodore Brongniart
Taxa named by Hermann zu Solms-Laubach